Microlinguistics is a branch of linguistics that concerns itself with the study of language systems in the abstract, without regard to the meaning or national content of linguistic expressions.  In micro-linguistics, language is reduced to the abstract mental elements of syntax and phonology.  It contrasts with macro-linguistics, which includes meanings, and especially with sociolinguistics, which studies how language and meaning function within human social systems. The term micro-linguistics was first used in print by George L. Trager, in an article published in 1949, in Studies in Linguistics: Occasional Papers.

References

Syntax
Phonology